Beauty and the Beast is the soundtrack album to the 2017 film Beauty and the Beast. The album, largely based on material from Disney's 1991 animated version, features songs and instrumental score composed by Alan Menken with lyrics by Howard Ashman and three new songs composed by Menken with lyrics by Tim Rice. The soundtrack album was released by Walt Disney Records on March 10, 2017.

The songs feature vocals from the film's ensemble cast including Emma Watson, Dan Stevens, Luke Evans, Kevin Kline, Josh Gad, Ewan McGregor, Stanley Tucci, Audra McDonald, Gugu Mbatha-Raw, Nathan Mack, Ian McKellen, and Emma Thompson.

Track listing

Deluxe editions on streaming services open with tracks 17-19 on disc one, maintaining the same running order after that.

Commercial performance
The album debuted at No. 3 on the Billboard 200 chart with 57,000 units, 48,000 of which are traditional album sales.   It has sold 337,000 copies in the United States as of July 2017.

Charts

Weekly charts

Year-end charts

Certifications

See also
 Beauty and the Beast (1991 soundtrack)

References

2017 soundtrack albums
2010s film soundtrack albums
Disney film soundtracks
Walt Disney Records soundtracks
Albums produced by Alan Menken
Beauty and the Beast (franchise)
Musical film soundtracks
Fantasy film soundtracks
Alan Menken soundtracks